Dardanus lagopodes, known commonly as the hairy red hermit crab, is a species of marine decapod crustacean in the family Diogenidae. Dardanus lagopodes is widespread throughout the tropical waters of the Indo-West Pacific region, including the Red Sea.

References

External links
 

Hermit crabs
Crustaceans described in 1775
Taxa named by Peter Forsskål